János Vajda (born 8 October 1949, in Miskolc) is a Hungarian composer.

Works, editions, recordings
Operas
 Barabás (1977), opera after Frigyes Karinthy
 Márió és a varázsló (1988), after Thomas Mann's Mario and the Magician (1929)
 Leonce és Léna (1999), opera after Georg Büchner's Leonce and Lena (1836/1895), libretto:  
 Karnyóné (2004), opera after Mihály Csokonai Vitéz, libretto: Szabolcs Várady
  (2021), opera after Molière (The Imaginary Invalid (1673)) and Mikhail Bulgakov (The Cabal of Hypocrites (1936)), libretto: Szabolcs Várady

Recordings
 Songs – Orbán Spanish songs. Songs to words by Sándor Weöres. János Vajda, Songs to words by Géza Szöcs: Andrea Meláth (mezzo-soprano), Emese Virág (piano). HCD31827 Hungaroton
 Missa in A, Orban: Missa prima HCD31929 Hungaroton

References

External links
 János Vajda, Budapest Music Centre

1949 births
Living people
Hungarian classical composers
Hungarian opera composers
Hungarian male classical composers
People from Miskolc